The extreme points of Norway include the coordinates that are farther north, south, east or west than any other location in Norway; and the highest and the lowest altitudes in the country. The northernmost point is Rossøya on Svalbard, the southernmost is Pysen in Mandal, the easternmost is Kræmerpynten on Svalbard, and the westernmost is Hoybergodden on Jan Mayen.

The Norwegian Antarctic territories—Bouvet Island, Queen Maud Land and Peter I Island—are not part of the Kingdom of Norway. If included, the Antarctic territories account for the southernmost, easternmost, westernmost and highest extreme points.

The latitude and longitude are expressed in degrees, minutes and seconds, in which an "N" value refers to the northern hemisphere, and an "S" value refers to the southern hemisphere. Similarly, a "E" longitude value refers to the eastern hemisphere, and a "W" refers to the western hemisphere. The extreme points of latitude and longitude are published by the Norwegian Mapping Authority, while the elevations are published by the World Fact Book. Both make use of the World Geodetic System (WGS) 84, a geodetic reference system.

Latitude and longitude

For the Kingdom of Norway, the northernmost point is Rossøya, just north of Nordaustlandet on the Svalbard archipelago, bordering the Barents Sea. The southernmost point is Pysen in Mandal bordering Skagerrak—the only latitude and longitude extreme point that is in Norway proper. The easternmost location is Kræmerpynten on Svalbard, bordering the Barents Sea, while the westernmost point is Hoybergodden on Jan Mayen, bordering the Greenland Sea.

All four latitude and longitude extreme points are bordering the sea; due to the geographic nature of the coastline, all extremities are located on islands. Therefore, extreme points of the Norwegian mainland are also included in the list. The northernmost point is Knivskjellodden, located in Magerøya in Finnmark. The northernmost mainland point is Cape Nordkinn, located in Lebesby, Finnmark; this is also the northernmost location of mainland Europe. Both border the Barents Sea. The southernmost location of Norway proper is Pysen, while the southernmost mainland location is Lindesnes; both border Skagerrak. The easternmost point is Hornøya, with Kibergsneset being the easternmost mainland location. Both are in Vardø in Finnmark. The westernmost location is Holmebåen in Solund, Sogn og Fjordane, while the westernmost mainland location is Vardetangen in Austrheim, Hordaland. Both border the North Sea.

If Antarctica is included, the southernmost point is the South Pole. All seven Antarctic claims meet there, so this point borders all other six territories. The easternmost point is the border between Queen Maud Land and the Australian Antarctic Territory, which follows the 45th meridian east. The westernmost point is Peter I Island. As the only Antarctic claim that is not a sector, it borders the Amundsen Sea.

Altitude

Galdhøpiggen is part of the Jotunheimen mountain range, as well as Jotunheimen National Park. It is also the highest peak along the Scandinavian Mountains. It is located in the Mühlig-Hofmann Mountains in Princess Astrid Coast. Norway's lowest point is located on the coast, at sea level. The coast stretches , including fjords, bays and islands.

Transportation 
Only public transportation.

Note that the southernmost point which is reachable without using a boat is in fact not Lindesnes, but a rocky cape in Ytre Farestad on the island Skjernøya. It is not per definition the southernmost mainland point, but can be reached by road Fv230 385.

See also

 Centre of Norway
 Geography of Norway
 Extreme points of Earth

References

External links

 
Norway
Lists of landforms of Norway